There are 82 counties in the U.S. state of Mississippi. Mississippi is tied with Arkansas for the most counties with two county seats, at 10.

Mississippi's postal abbreviation is MS and its FIPS state code is 28.

List

|}

References

Mississippi, counties in

Counties